HD 68402 is a solitary star located in the circumpolar constellation Volans. With an apparent magnitude of 9.09, it is invisible to the naked eye but can be seen with an amateur telescope. This star is located at a distance of 256 light years based on its parallax shift but is drifting away at a rate of 11.60 km/s.

HD 68402 has a classification of G5 IV/V, which indicates that it is a G5 star with the characteristics of a subgiant and main-sequence star. Contrary to its classification, it is actually a G1 dwarf. At present it is slightly more massive than the Sun and has a similar radius to the latter. It radiates at 1.17 times the luminosity of the Sun from its photosphere at an effective temperature of 5,907 K, which gives it a yellow hue. At an age of 1 billion years HD 68402 has a projected rotational velocity of almost 3 km/s and is metal rich like most planetary hosts (1.94 times to be exact).

Planetary System
In 2017, a superjovian planet was discovered using doppler spectroscopy data from HARPS and CORALIE.

References

G-type main-sequence stars
G-type subgiants
Durchmusterung objects
068402
039589
Volans (constellation)
Planetary systems with one confirmed planet